National Wheelchair Basketball League may refer to:

 National Wheelchair Basketball League (Australia), Australian mixed league
 Women's National Wheelchair Basketball League, Australian women's league